Chaplain (Major General) Patrick John Hessian (May 20, 1928 – September 8, 2007) was a United States Army officer who served as the 16th Chief of Chaplains of the United States Army from 1982 to 1986. He was ordained in 1953, and attended seminary at the Saint Paul Seminary School of Divinity in St. Paul, MN.

Awards and decorations

References

Further reading

1928 births
2007 deaths
United States Army generals
Recipients of the Soldier's Medal
Recipients of the Air Medal
Chiefs of Chaplains of the United States Army
United States Army personnel of the Vietnam War
Vietnam War chaplains
Deputy Chiefs of Chaplains of the United States Army
People from Belle Plaine, Minnesota
20th-century American clergy
Military personnel from Minnesota